Georgia State Route 121 (SR 121) is a  state highway between Charlton County and Augusta. It is part of a three-state multistate route beginning in Florida and ending in South Carolina.

Route description

SR 121 begins in rural Charlton County at the Florida state line near the southernmost point in the state. Here, the roadway continues as State Road 121. From the state line, it travels to the north, concurrent with SR 23. This segment of the route is called the Okefenokee Parkway. After passing through St. George, it has a concurrency with US 1/US 23/US 301/SR 4/SR 15 in Folkston. Shortly afterwards, US 301/SR 23 split from the other routes, while US 1/US 23/SR 4/SR 15/SR 121 stay concurrent until Racepond, where  US 1/US 23/SR 4 continue to the northwest while SR 15/SR 121 branch off to the northeast. In Hoboken, the routes intersect with US 82/SR 520. In Blackshear is an intersection with US 84/SR 38. North of this intersection, SR 15 splits off to the northwest, while SR 121 heads to the northeast again. The road has a brief concurrency with SR 203 shortly afterwards. In Surrency, the road intersects US 341/SR 27. Later, SR 169, and then SR 144 form brief concurrencies with the road. A short time later, the route is reunited with SR 23/SR 57 and becomes concurrent with one of these two routes once again. In Reidsville, the route intersects US 280/SR 30. In Cobbtown, SR 57 splits off. Just south of Metter is an interchange with Interstate 16 (I-16), specifically Exit 104. Within Metter itself, SR 23 splits off. North of Metter, US 80/SR 26 intersect with the road. North of that junction, SR 121 begins a concurrency with US 25/SR 67. SR 23 joins the concurrency shortly afterward. In Millen, SR 23/SR 67 split off. SR 24 briefly joins the concurrency in Waynesboro. In Augusta, SR 121 travels concurrently with US 1/US 25/US 78/US 278/SR 10 along Gordon Highway and serves as a major road. At the South Carolina state line, SR 10 end, while US 1/US 25/US 78/US 278/SR 121 continue, concurrent with South Carolina Highway 121.

Woodpecker Trail
In 2004, the Senate and Georgia House of Representatives of the state of Georgia passed legislation designating SR 121 as the Woodpecker Trail Highway from the Florida state line to the South Carolina state line and was signed into law by Governor Sonny Perdue on May 17, 2004. On September 19, 2005, Governor Perdue and others officially dedicated the Woodpecker Trail Highway in Augusta. A newly designed Woodpecker Trail logo was imprinted onto highway signs which have been placed along the trail at key highway junction points.

The origin of the trail's name dates back to the 1920s when it was listed by AAA, and, in the 1940s, highway signs using Walter Lantz's Woody Woodpecker character marked the highway but eventually fell out of use. Of course, it was in use before then, maybe as early as 1915 by Native Americans, horse-drawn buggies, and the first horseless carriages.

While the highway continues into Florida and South Carolina as State Road 121, efforts to continue the Woodpecker Trail designation and signage in those states have been unsuccessful.

Major intersections

Special routes

Charlton County spur route

State Route 121 Spur (SR 121 Spur) was a spur route of SR 121 that existed in the central part of Charlton County, on the eastern side of the Okefenokee Swamp. In 1952, an unnumbered road was established from Camp Cornelia east to SR 23 south-southwest of Folkston. Between June 1960 and June 1963, SR 121 was extended on SR 23. In 1976, this road was designated as SR 121 Spur. In 1993, the spur route was decommissioned.

Waynesboro bypass route

State Route 121 Bypass (SR 121 Byp.) is a bypass around most of Waynesboro. It is concurrent with U.S. Route 25 Bypass (US 25 Byp.) for its entire length.

See also
 
 
 Central Savannah River Area
 Transportation in Augusta, Georgia

References

External links

 
 Georgia Roads (Routes 121 - 140)

121
Transportation in Charlton County, Georgia
Transportation in Brantley County, Georgia
Transportation in Pierce County, Georgia
Transportation in Appling County, Georgia
Transportation in Tattnall County, Georgia
Transportation in Candler County, Georgia
Transportation in Emanuel County, Georgia
Transportation in Jenkins County, Georgia
Transportation in Burke County, Georgia
Transportation in Richmond County, Georgia
Transportation in Augusta, Georgia